Filipp Vladislavovich Dvoretskov (born 17 March 1997) is a Russian football player. He plays for FC Neftekhimik Nizhnekamsk.

Club career
He made his debut in the Russian Professional Football League for FC Torpedo Moscow on 20 July 2015 in a game against FC Energomash Belgorod. He made his Russian Football National League debut for FC Mordovia Saransk on 29 July 2018 in a game against FC Krasnodar-2.

References

External links
 Profile by Russian Professional Football League
 Profile by Football National League

1997 births
Footballers from Moscow
Living people
Russian footballers
Russia youth international footballers
Russia under-21 international footballers
Association football midfielders
FC Torpedo Moscow players
FC Nosta Novotroitsk players
FC Mordovia Saransk players
FC Neftekhimik Nizhnekamsk players
Russian First League players
Russian Second League players